The women's 20 kilometres walk event at the 2017 Summer Universiade was held on 26 August at the Taipei Municipal Stadium.

Medalists

Individual

Team

Results

Individual

Team

References

Walk